Luigi Antoine Josephe Calamatta (21 June 1801 – 8 March 1869 in Milan) was an Italian painter and engraver. He was born at Civitavecchia, in the Papal States.

Biography
Orphaned early, he went to live with an uncle, then moved to Rome to live in the l'Ospizio San Michele. He was expelled from the hospice, and became the ward of fellow artists.

He studied drawing at Rome under Francesco Giangiacomo, took his early lessons in engraving from Marchetti. and executed his first plate under the eye of Ricciari. He went to Paris in 1822, and became a follower of Ingres, whose style he copied in his engraving of The Vow of Louis XIII. He made his first appearance at the Salon of 1827, with an engraving of Bajazet and the Shepherd, after Pierre Joseph Dedreux-Dorcy. He next produced the Mask of Napoleon, from the cast taken by Dr. Antommarchi at St. Helena in 1814, grouping around it a symbolic gathering, embracing portraits, chiefly from Ingres' drawings, of Madame Dudevant (George Sand), Paganini, Martin, and Duclos. He visited Florence in 1836, and the following year saw him installed as professor of engraving at Brussels. He was later appointed by Giuseppe Longhi to a similar post at the Brera in Milan, where he died in 1869. His wife Joséphine was also an artist, and produced an excellent portrait of her father, the archeologist Raoul Rochette, as well as The Virgin (1842), Eudora and Cymadaceus (1844),St. Cecilia (1846),Eve (1848), St. Veronica (1851).
He was teacher at the École royale de gravure, Brussels.

Opus 

Monna Lisa (1837) after Da Vinci.
Madonna di Foligno Madonna della Sedia, The Vision of Ezekiel, and Peace (1855) after Raphael.
Our Lord walking on the Sea; after Cigoli
Francesca da Rimini; after Scheffer.
Duke of Orleans; Count Molè (1865); The Vow of Louis XIII; and Madmouiselle Boimara; after Ingres
Guizot; after Delaroche.
Portraits of Actor and Miss Lèvera; after Deveria.
Portrait of Lamennais; after Ary Scheffer.
Beatrice Cenci (1857) after Guido Reni.
Recollections of Rome, partly etched; after Stevens
Portraits of Rubens, Georges Sand, and Ingres.
Portrait of the King of Spain; after Madrazo.

References

Short biography

1801 births
1869 deaths
People from Civitavecchia
19th-century Italian painters
Italian male painters
Italian engravers
Members of the Royal Academy of Belgium
19th-century Italian male artists